Talbot was an electoral district of the Legislative Assembly in the Australian colony of Victoria from 1856 to 1859. It was based in western Victoria, bounded on the west by Bet Bet Creek, the north by the Loddon River, on the east by the Coliban River and included the area around the towns of Creswick, Daylesford and Carisbrook.

The district of Talbot was one of the initial districts of the first Victorian Legislative Assembly, 1856.
In 1859, new electoral districts including Avoca, Ararat and Creswick were created.

In 1877, a new district of Maryborough and Talbot was created.

Members for Talbot
Two members were elected to the district.

References

Former electoral districts of Victoria (Australia)
1856 establishments in Australia
1859 disestablishments in Australia